is a Japanese competitive swimmer. He competed in the men's 4 × 200 metre freestyle relay at the 2016 Summer Olympics, winning the bronze medal. He also competed in the men's 400 metre freestyle event. Ehara serves in the Japan Ground Self-Defense Force as a sergeant first class.

References

External links
 

1993 births
Living people
Japanese male freestyle swimmers
Olympic swimmers of Japan
Swimmers at the 2016 Summer Olympics
Olympic bronze medalists for Japan
Olympic bronze medalists in swimming
Medalists at the 2016 Summer Olympics
Universiade medalists in swimming
Sportspeople from Yamanashi Prefecture
Japan Ground Self-Defense Force personnel
Swimmers at the 2018 Asian Games
Asian Games gold medalists for Japan
Asian Games silver medalists for Japan
Asian Games medalists in swimming
Medalists at the 2018 Asian Games
Universiade bronze medalists for Japan
Medalists at the 2015 Summer Universiade
21st-century Japanese people
20th-century Japanese people